was the name for girls and young women who served during the Second World War with the German Wehrmacht as auxiliaries.

History 
In the beginning, women in Nazi Germany were not involved in the Wehrmacht, as Hitler ideologically opposed conscription for women, stating that Germany would "not form any section of women grenade throwers or any corps of women elite snipers." However, with many men going to the front, women were placed in auxiliary positions within the Wehrmacht, called Wehrmachtshelferinnen, participating in tasks such as:
 telephone, telegraph and transmission operators,
 administrative clerks, typists and messengers,
 operators of listening equipment, in anti-aircraft defense, operating projectors for anti-aircraft defense, employees within meteorology services, and auxiliary civil defense personnel
 volunteer nurses in military health service (similar to the role of women working with the German Red Cross or other voluntary organizations).

They were placed under the same authority as Hiwis, auxiliary personnel of the army and they were assigned to duties within the Reich, and to a lesser extent, in the occupied territories, for example in the general government of occupied Poland, in France, and later in Yugoslavia, in Greece and in Romania.

In the media 
1958 , directed by Werner Klingler.

See also 
Ranks and insignia of the German Women’s Auxiliary Services

References 

Military units and formations of Germany in World War II
Women in Nazi Germany
Society of Nazi Germany
Women in the military
Auxiliary military units